State Route 148 (SR 148) is an east–west state highway in eastern Ohio. The eastern terminus of SR 148 is at SR 7 in Powhatan Point. From the SR 26 intersection easterly to its endpoint at SR 7, SR 148 generally runs in parallel to the Captina Creek.

In Powhatan Point, SR 148 intersects SR 7 twice. The signed portion of SR 148 comes to an end at the first (southernmost) intersection with SR 7. However, the Ohio Department of Transportation defines SR 148 as continuing as an unsigned route through Powhatan Point, following Front Street, Water Street, Fillmore Street, Second Street and Main Street through the village to its defined eastern terminus at its northern junction with SR 7 in the northern end of the village.

Route description

No part of SR 148 is incorporated within the National Highway System.

History
SR 148 was commissioned in 1923, between Cambridge and Powhatan Point. In 1927, the western terminus was moved to its current location, south of Barnesville. The western terminus was extended west to an intersection with SR 147, in 1939. Between 1942 and 1944 the western terminus was moved back to its current location.

Major intersections

References

External links

148
Transportation in Belmont County, Ohio